Kajal Bandyopadhyay (born 13 February 1954) is a Bangladeshi poet, writer, and translator. He teaches English literature and previously worked as head of the dept. of English at the University of Dhaka.

Education 
Bandyopadhyay graduated from the University of Dhaka and completed his Ph.D. from Jadavpur University, Calcutta on Wole Soyinka.

Literature 
As a Marxist poet, Bandyopadhyay vividly portrays the "lives of toiling masses, particularly their problems, social conflicts, intrigues and inner complexes" with poignant poetic expressions.  A presidium member of Bangladesh Hindu Buddhist Christian Unity Council, Bandyopadhyay is also a vehement activist against communal violence in Bangladesh. He champions secularism and non-communalism in Bangladesh; to protest attacks on minority communities in Bangladesh, he wanted to receive self-imprisonment in 2013.

Professor Bandyopadhyay's “essays speak of establishing a plural and classless society. They also unveil religious orthodoxy and fanaticism, and bring out the causes of cultural imperialism.”

Interest on African literature 
Kajal Banerjee has an especial fascination for African literature. He did his Ph.D. on the plays of Noble laureate African writer Wole Soyinka. Some books of his essays on African literature in English and Ibsen's plays have been received warmly.

Selected publications

Books of Bengali poems

Essay

Edited Bibliography

Translations

Biography in Bengali

References

1954 births
Bengali Hindus
Bangladeshi Hindus
Bangladeshi male writers
Academic staff of the University of Dhaka
Living people